The Deacon John Moore House is a historic house at 37 Elm Street in Windsor, Connecticut.  The oldest portion of the house was built in 1664, making it one of the oldest houses in the state.  It has been altered and renovated, but retains its original frame and other elements.  It was listed on the National Register of Historic Places in 1977.

Description
The Deacon John Moore House stands just outside the village center of Windsor, on the south side of Elm Street roughly midway between Broad Street and Spring Street.  It is a -story timber-frame structure, with a steeply pitched gable roof and clapboarded exterior.  The second story projects beyond the first in the colonial garrison style.  The ground floor is five bays across, with two sash windows on either side of the center entrance. The entrance, a modern replacement, is flanked by sidelight windows.  The second floor is three bays across, with equally spaced sash windows.

The house was built about 1664, and originally stood facing the Windsor Green at the corner of Broad and Elm Streets.  It was probably moved once around 1805, and again to its present location in 1897.  At that time it retained its eastern-facing orientation; it was rotated in 1938 to face the street.

History
John Moore was likely the brother of Thomas Moore.  Both men were born in England and moved to Windsor.  They arrived from England on the ship Mary and John and landed in Dorchester, Massachusetts in 1630 with two prominent ministers of the time, John Maverick and John Warham.  In 1635, part of the group moved to Windsor, Connecticut, but the Moores remained in Dorchester until 1639.

In 1651, John Moore was ordained a deacon. He was made deputy governor of Connecticut under John Winthrop.  Moore had one son named John Moore Jr, and four daughters:  Elizabeth Moore (married to Nathaniel Loomis); Abagail Moore (married to Thomas Bissell); Mindwell Moore (married to Nathaniel Bissell); and Hannah Moore (married to John Drake Jr.).

In addition to being a deacon, John Moore was also a successful woodworker.  He was, and still is, known for using the foliated vine design, which depicts vines and blossoms carved in shallow relief with flat surfaces.  There was a network of families in Windsor who dominated the woodworking trade, and John Moore was considered to be at the center.

See also
List of the oldest buildings in Connecticut
National Register of Historic Places listings in Windsor, Connecticut

References

Houses in Windsor, Connecticut
Houses on the National Register of Historic Places in Connecticut
Houses completed in 1664
National Register of Historic Places in Hartford County, Connecticut
1664 establishments in Connecticut